Orthopristis is a genus of marine ray-finned fish, grunts belonging to family Haemulidae. They are found in the Atlantic and Pacific coasts of the Americas.

Species
The currently recognized species in this genus are:
 Orthopristis cantharinus (Jenyns, 1840) (sheephead grunt)
 Orthopristis chalceus (Günther, 1864) (brassy grunt)
 Orthopristis chrysoptera (Linnaeus, 1766) (pigfish)
 Orthopristis forbesi D. S. Jordan & Starks, 1897
 Orthopristis lethopristis D. S. Jordan & Fesler, 1889 (scalyfin grunt)
 Orthopristis reddingi D. S. Jordan & R. E. Richardson, 1895 (bronze-striped grunt)
 Orthopristis ruber (G. Cuvier, 1830) (corocoro grunt)

References

Haemulinae
Marine fish genera